Wayne County Community College District (WCCCD) is a public community college district with its headquarters in Detroit, Michigan. It was founded in 1967 and has six campuses: Eastern, Downtown, Downriver, Northwest, Western, and University Square.

Governance
The college is governed by a nine-member board of trustees, three seats are elected every two years for six-year terms.

Campuses

The Northwest Campus, located in northwest Detroit, was for many years located on Greenfield Road just south of Joy Road, less than half a mile from the Dearborn city line.  In August 2008, the campus relocated to a new location at 8200 West Outer Drive, just west of the Southfield Freeway, at the former site of Mercy College of Detroit before it merged in 1990 with University of Detroit to become University of Detroit Mercy (UDM) and after the merger the UDM Dental School.

The district also has a  western campus located at the corner of Haggerty and I-94 in Van Buren Township, Michigan.  It was initially built in 1981 and as of 2008 is going through a  expansion.

The downtown campus is located at 801 West Fort Street in downtown Detroit.

The Eastern Campus is located on Detroit's eastside.  It is located at 5901 Connor Road just north of Warren Avenue, at the I-94 freeway exit.

The University Square campus at 19305 Vernier Road in Harper Woods opened in January 2009. The campus, known as the Grosse Pointe / Harper Woods Campus Center, was originally located by Eastland Mall in Harper Woods.

District areas
Most areas of Wayne County are served by Wayne Community College District. Wayne County places that are not in-district include : Dearborn, Garden City, Highland Park, Livonia, Northville, Plymouth, and sections of Canton Township and Dearborn Heights.

See also

 Other community colleges in Wayne County  
 Henry Ford College (Dearborn)
 Schoolcraft College (northwestern Wayne County)

References

External links
Official website

Universities and colleges in Wayne County, Michigan
Educational institutions established in 1967
NJCAA athletics
Two-year colleges in the United States